Rock Chen Chung-nin,  (born 6 June 1966) is a Hong Kong investment manager and politician who has been a member of the Legislative Council since 2022. He is also one of the vice-chairmen of the Chinese General Chamber of Commerce and the chairman of two investment firms.

On 5 January 2022, Carrie Lam announced new warnings and restrictions against social gathering due to potential COVID-19 outbreaks. One day later, it was discovered that Chen attended a birthday party hosted by Witman Hung Wai-man, with 222 guests. At least one guest tested positive with COVID-19, causing many guests to be quarantined. Additionally, Chen brought one of his staff members to the party, and the next day, the staff member visited the Legislative Council Complex and Citic Tower.

In February 2022, Chen told SCMP that he would be attending the 2022 Two Sessions, as a Hong Kong delegate.

Electoral history

References 

1966 births
Living people
Delegates to the 14th National People's Congress from Hong Kong
Democratic Alliance for the Betterment and Progress of Hong Kong politicians
HK LegCo Members 2022–2025
Hong Kong pro-Beijing politicians
Members of the Election Committee of Hong Kong, 2021–2026